Kalusa (also Romanized as Kalūsā; also known as Kaluso) is a village in Harazpey-ye Shomali Rural District, Sorkhrud District, Mahmudabad County, Mazandaran Province, Iran. At the 2006 census, its population was 208, in 51 families.

References 

Populated places in Mahmudabad County